This is a list of the hypati, patricians, consuls, and dukes of Gaeta. Many of the dates are uncertain and sometimes the status of the rulership, with co-rulers and suzerain–vassal relations, is vague.

Native rule (839–1032)

Anatolian dynasty
Constantine (839–866)
Marinus I (839–866)

Docibilan dynasty
Docibilis I (866-906)
John I (867–933 or 934), also patrician from 877
Docibilis II (914 or 915–954), co–hypatus from 906
John II (954–962 or 963), co–duke from 933 or 934, consul
Gregory (962 or 963–978)
Marinus II (978–984)
John III (984–1008), co–duke from 979
John IV (1008–1012), co–duke from 991
John V (1012–1032), also consul
Emilia, grandmother, regent (1012–1027)
Leo I, uncle, regent (1017–1023)

Lombard period (1032–1064)
In 1041, Guaimar gave direct control and his title to the count of Aversa. In 1058, Gaeta was made subject to the count of Aversa, by then prince of Capua.

Pandulf I (1032–1038)
Pandulf II (1032–1038), co–duke
Leo II (1042), a member of the Docibilan family
Guaimar (1042–1045)
Ranulf (1042–1045)
Asclettin (1045)
Atenulf I (1045–1062), also count of Aquino
Atenulf II (1062–1064), also count of Aquino
Maria, regent (1062–1065), daughter of Pandulf I, wife of Atenulf I and William I, and mother of Atenulf II and Lando

Norman period (1064–1140)
These were vassals of the princes of Capua. Princes Richard I and his son Jordan I used the titles duke and consul from 1058 and 1062 respectively.

William I (1064)
Lando (1064–1065), also count of Traietto
Dannibaldo (1066–1067)
Geoffrey (1068–1086)
Reginald (from 1086)
Gualganus (until 1091)
Landulf (1091–1103)
William II (1103–1104 or 1105)
Richard II (1104 or 1105–1111)
Andrew (1111–1112)
Jonathan (1112–1121)
Richard III (1121–1140)

In 1140, Gaeta went directly to the king of Sicily, Roger II.  Under the Hautevilles and the Hohenstaufen, sovereigns continued issuing coinage as rulers of Gaeta until 1229.

Victory title
In the mid–19th century, the soldier, politician and diplomat Enrico Cialdini (1811–1892) was created Duca di Gaeta by the King of Italy as a victory title in recognition of his role during the Siege of Gaeta (1860).

Lists of Italian nobility
Dukedoms of Italy
Lists of dukes
Duchy of Gaeta